House Rules is the second and final mixtape by Slaughterhouse, a hip hop supergroup consisting of rappers Joe Budden, Joell Ortiz, KXNG CROOKED and Royce da 5'9". It was released on May 21, 2014, exclusively on DatPiff. It served as a warm up for their 3rd studio album Glass House, which would eventually never see the light of day. The mixtape followed on from the groups' last successful mixtape, having been downloaded over 100,000 times in the first week.

Critical reception

The mixtape received positive reviews from music critics. Omar Burgess of HipHopDX wrote "until the next retail album, the questions and expectations still remain unanswered. In the meantime, fans can enjoy a damn good mixtape." XXL concluded "if this is what we can expect from Slaughterhouse in 2014, there’s a lot to be excited about."

Track listing

References

2014 mixtape albums
Slaughterhouse (group) albums
Albums produced by Nottz
Albums produced by Illmind
Albums produced by AraabMuzik
Albums produced by Harry Fraud
Albums produced by the Heatmakerz